Sir Louis Phillip Odumegwu Ojukwu, OBE (1909– September 1966) was a Nigerian business tycoon from the Ojukwu family of Nwakanwa quarters Obiuno Umudim Nnewi. 

Ojukwu, was the founder of Ojukwu Transport, Ojukwu Stores and Ojukwu Textiles. At his peak, he was the first and founding president of The Nigerian Stock Exchange as well as president of The African Continental Bank. He was also either chairman or served on the board of directors of some of Nigeria's most profitable companies such as Shell Oil Nigeria Limited, Guinness Nigeria Limited, Nigerian National Shipping Line, Nigerian Cement Factory, Nigerian Coal Corporation, Costain West Africa Ltd, John Holt plc, Nigerian Marketing Board amongst others. He won a parliamentary seat during the nation's first republic. 

He attended a primary school in Asaba and the Hope Waddell Training Institute. His son Chukwuemeka Odumegwu Ojukwu was a Nigerian military governor and the president of the secessionist state of Biafra.

Life and career

Ojukwu started his professional career at the Agricultural department before leaving to join John Holt as a tyre sales clerk. He also incorporated a textile company in Onitsha to supplement his income during this period. At John Holt, he noticed the severe strain a lack of adequate transportation had on Eastern textile traders. He left to create his own transport company to improve the trading environment for Nigerian traders. 

His success was also oiled by the economic boom after World War II, working with the West African Railway Company and the newly inaugurated produce boards, he provided his fleet for commodity transportation and for other traders use. As a transporter he had his own transport company (Ojukwu Transport Limited) which was the first major transport company to move the easterners to Lagos from the Asaba end of the Niger river after they might have crossed over from Onitsha on a boat.

During the 1950s, he diversified his interest, bought some industries, invested heavily in the real estate sector and became a director in numerous major corporations including the state-owned Nigerian National Shipping Line. He was a member of the board of Nigerian Coal Corporation, Shell Oil, D'Archy, and African Continental Bank.

During the period of pre-independence and in the First Republic, Ojukwu was an active member and donor to the political party, NCNC. He was a one-time member of the House of Representative. In 1958, he was chairman of the Eastern Region Development Corporation and the Eastern Regional Marketing Board.

On 1 May 1, 1953, he was appointed head of an NCNC peace committee and given power to choose most of the committee's members. The committee was charged with the responsibility of restoring peace in the regional House of Assembly. His views on policy were a little bit capitalistic and right of Zik's socialist undertones. 

He was a co-author of a report on the Economic Mission to Europe and North America with Azikiwe, the report recommended the investment of extra funds from the produce marketing board in a regional bank and public corporations to stimulate economic development.

Throughout the era of the World War and after, the Ojukwu trucks carried goods and raked in income for their owner. At a point, the British had their supplies for the war moved by Louis's trucks - a service for which Louis was later rewarded; years later, he was knighted by  Queen Elizabeth II.

As his wealth grew, his influence and clout began to extend beyond the industry. He was active in pre-independence politics and was a donor of the National Council of Nigeria and Cameroons (NCNC), a political party which had Nnamdi Azikiwe as one of its members. At a point, he was elected to the House of Representatives. By the time of his death in 1966, Louis Odumegwu Ojukwu's wealth was worth $40 billion by the current value.

Death
Ojukwu died in 1966, just a year before the Nigerian civil war. His son, Chukwuemeka Odumegwu Ojukwu, was the leader of the secessionist state of Biafra.

References

Sources
 Tom Forrest, The Advance of African Capital:The Growth of Nigerian Private Enterprise
 

1966 deaths
Nigerian recipients of British titles
Nigerian knights
Nigerian Knights Bachelor
20th-century Nigerian businesspeople
Igbo businesspeople
People from Nnewi
1909 births
Date of birth unknown
Nigerian chairpersons of corporations
Hope Waddell Institute alumni
People from colonial Nigeria